Georgia State Route 34 Bypass may refer to:

 Georgia State Route 34 Bypass (Franklin): a former bypass route of State Route 34 that existed entirely in Franklin
 Georgia State Route 34 Bypass (Newnan): a bypass route of State Route 34 that exists partially in Newnan

034 Bypass